Raymond Battle (March 17, 1918 – March 1, 1973) was an American Negro league third baseman in the 1940s.

A native of Rocky Mount, North Carolina, Battle made his Negro leagues debut with the Homestead Grays during the team's 1944 Negro World Series championship season. The following season with the Grays was his final one. Battle died in Rocky Mount in 1973 at age 54.

References

External links
 and Seamheads

1918 births
1973 deaths
Homestead Grays players
20th-century African-American sportspeople
Baseball infielders